Why Not Me may refer to:

Music
 Why Not Me (album), by The Judds, 1984
 "Why Not Me" (The Judds song), the title song
 "Why Not Me" (Fred Knoblock song), 1980
 "Why Not Me?", a song by Enrique Iglesias from Euphoria, 2010
 "Why Not Me", a song by Eric Church, 2017
 "Why Not Me", a song by Forrest, a side project of Forrest Frank of the band Surfaces, 2018

Other uses
 Why Not Me? (book), a 2015 book by Mindy Kaling
 Why Not Me? (film), a 1999 French comedy
 Why Not Me? (novel), a 1999 novel by Al Franken

See also
 Not Me (disambiguation)